Ziad Samir Jarrah (May 11, 1975 – September 11, 2001) was a Lebanese and one of the perpetrators of the September 11 attacks. He was the hijacker-pilot of United Airlines Flight 93, crashing the plane into a field in a rural area near Shanksville, Pennsylvania—after a passenger uprising—as part of the coordinated attacks.

After a wealthy and secularist upbringing, Jarrah moved to Germany in 1996. He became involved in the planning of the September 11 attacks while attending Hamburg University of Applied Sciences (HAW) in the late 1990s, meeting Mohamed Atta, Marwan al-Shehhi and Ramzi bin al-Shibh, forming what is now known as the Hamburg cell. Jarrah was recruited by Osama bin Laden for the attacks in 1999. Unique among the hijackers, he was close to his family and girlfriend. He was reportedly the only hijacker who had any significant apprehensions about carrying out the attacks. His family and friends continue to deny his association with the attacks.

Jarrah arrived in the United States in June 2000. He trained at Huffman Aviation together with Atta and Al-Shehhi with their flight instructor Rudi Dekkers from June 2000 to January 2001, after relocating to Florida from New Jersey.

On September 7, 2001, Jarrah flew from Fort Lauderdale to Newark. Four days later, he boarded United Airlines Flight 93, and was believed to have taken over as the pilot of the aircraft along with his team of hijackers, which included Saeed al-Ghamdi, Ahmed al-Nami and Ahmed al-Haznawi, who together made an attempt to crash the plane into either the United States Capitol or the White House, which was thwarted when the passengers started a revolt against the hijackers.

Early life and education 
Jarrah was born in Beirut, Lebanon, to a wealthy family. He was brought up in the Muslim quarter of the city, Tarik Jdideh, and received his primary and secondary education from schools in that area. His parents were nominally Sunni Muslim, although they lived a secular lifestyle. In his childhood, he had always wanted to fly planes, but his family discouraged this. "I stopped him from being a pilot," his father told the Wall Street Journal a week after the attacks. "I only have one son and I was afraid that he would crash."

From 1995 to 1996, while Jarrah was still living in Yemen, according to his family, somebody of the same name rented an apartment in Brooklyn, New York. The landlords claimed it was the same Ziad Jarrah as in the FBI photographs.

In the spring of 1996, Jarrah moved to Germany with his cousin, Salim. They were there to take a certificate course in German at the University of Greifswald, which was required of foreigners studying in Germany who do not speak the language. While sharing an apartment with his cousin, he reportedly attended discos and beach parties, and his attendance at the mosque fell off. He met Aysel Şengün, a German-born woman of Turkish ancestry studying dentistry, and the two became good friends. They dated on and off for the remainder of his life and lived together briefly, which vexed his more religious friends.

In September 1997, Jarrah left Greifswald and instead began studying aerospace engineering at the Fachhochschule (University of Applied Sciences) in Hamburg, while working at a Volkswagen paint shop in nearby Wolfsburg. While in Hamburg, he rented an apartment from Rosemarie Canel, who would paint a portrait of him that he would bring back as a gift for his mother that December.

The 9/11 Commission Report states that Jarrah was a member of the Hamburg cell, along with Mohamed Atta and the others. He did not live with any of the others, however, and can be confirmed to have met with any of them in Hamburg only on a single occasion: that of Said Bahaji's wedding at the al-Quds Mosque in October 1999.

Training in Afghanistan 
In late 1999, Jarrah, Mohamed Atta, Marwan al-Shehhi, Said Bahaji, and Ramzi bin al-Shibh decided to travel to Chechnya to fight Russian soldiers in the Second Chechen War. Khalid al-Masri and Mohamedou Ould Slahi convinced them at the last minute to travel instead to Afghanistan to meet with Osama bin Laden and train for terrorist attacks. Jarrah was known as Abu Tariq al-Lubnaani by al-Qaeda. They were told they were on a highly secret mission and were instructed to return to Germany after the operation and enroll in flight school. In October 1999, Ziad Jarrah was filmed at Said Bahaji's wedding with other 9/11 hijackers, including Marwan al-Shehhi. 

In 2006, a video surfaced showing Jarrah, still bearded, reading his will in January 2000 along with Mohamed Atta. Not long after this, Jarrah shaved his beard and began to act in a more secular way, according to Şengün. Many of the future hijackers attempted to hide their radicalism and blend in with the population. To hide his travels to Afghanistan (which may have concerned security officials at international airports) Jarrah reported his passport stolen in February 2000 and received a blank duplicate, just as hijackers Atta and Shehhi had done the previous month.

Jarrah dropped out of the Fachhochschule and began looking at flight schools. He claimed that this was to fulfill his childhood dream of being a pilot. After looking in several countries, he decided that none of the flight schools in Europe were adequate. On the advice of a childhood friend, he prepared to move to the United States.

In the United States 

Jarrah apparently entered the United States on seven separate occasions, more than any other hijacker. On May 25, 2000, he applied for and received a five-year US B-1/B-2
(tourist/business) visa in Berlin. On June 27, 2000, he went to the US for the first time, arriving at Newark International Airport. He then traveled to Florida together with al-Shehhi and Atta, where the three men enrolled full-time at Huffman Aviation, in Venice. Jarrah did not apply for a change in his status, from a tourist visa to a student visa, thus violating his immigration status.

Jarrah was enrolled in flight school for six months, from June 2000 to January 15, 2001. At the flight school, many of his classmates remember him fondly, describing him as kind and trustworthy, and remember him drinking beer occasionally. Jarrah was unique among the hijackers in that he did not live with any other hijackers, but rather lived with a German student named Thorsten Biermann. Biermann did not observe Jarrah acting particularly religiously or overtly politically. Jarrah occasionally flew back to Germany to visit Aysel Şengün, his Turkish-German girlfriend, and called or e-mailed her nearly every day.

Rudi Dekkers, a Dutchman and the flight instructor of Huffman Aviation (which is now out of business), was interviewed after the attacks in 2001 by authorities. According to Dekkers, both Jarrah and Al-Shehhi were good students, unlike Atta, who misbehaved and refused to follow instructions. Dekkers told Atta that he was going to kick him out of the school if his behavior did not change, and as a response, Atta's behavior began to improve. Dekkers also said that he went with Al-Shehhi and Jarrah to a bar in Sarasota, Florida named Shamrock Pub after one of their flight lessons. At the bar, they talked to Dekkers about their plans after getting their pilot licenses, and Jarrah said to Dekkers "I got a job lined up and we are planning to become pilots."

Jarrah had obtained his license to fly small aircraft in August 2000, and began training to fly large jets later that year. He flew to Beirut to visit his family, and then to Germany to visit his girlfriend, Şengün. He brought her back to the United States for a ten-day visit, and she even attended a flight school session with him. In late January 2001, he again flew to Beirut to visit his father, who was ill, and then to Germany to visit his girlfriend. He returned to the United States once again in late February. His behavior was markedly different from the other hijackers, who broke off all familial and romantic relations.

On his way back to the US, he passed through the United Arab Emirates, according to that country's officials, where he was initially reported as having been interviewed by authorities on January 30, 2001, at the request of the CIA. He allegedly admitted to having been to Afghanistan and Pakistan, although the CIA has since denied the claim and the 9/11 Commission Report does not mention it. The Florida flight school where Jarrah had been studying also said he was in school there until January 15, 2001.

On May 6, Jarrah registered for a two-month membership at the US1 Fitness Center, a gym in Dania Beach, Florida—he would later renew his membership for two more months, and eventually had lessons in close-quarters combat. It is believed that sometime in that month, Ahmed al-Haznawi, who arrived on June 8, moved in with Jarrah. Jarrah rented a new apartment in Lauderdale-by-the-Sea after both men gave the landlord photocopies of their German passports, which he later turned over to the FBI.

On June 25, Jarrah took Haznawi to Holy Cross Hospital in Fort Lauderdale, Florida, on the advice of his landlord. Haznawi was treated by Dr. Christos Tsonas, who gave him antibiotics for a cut on his left calf. While he told staff that he had bumped into a suitcase, the media briefly reported it as a sign of cutaneous anthrax, hoping to show a link to the 2001 anthrax attacks, although the FBI later addressed the rumors, stating that "exhaustive testing did not support that anthrax was present anywhere the hijackers had been."

In mid-July 2001, some of the hijackers and members of the Hamburg cell gathered near Salou, Spain, for a period of a few days up to a couple of weeks. There seemed to be tension between Jarrah and Atta about the plot in its late stages. Atta had complained to Ramzi bin al-Shibh about his difficulty in getting through to Jarrah and his fear that Jarrah might withdraw from the plot completely. On July 25, Jarrah flew to Germany on a one-way ticket and again met with his girlfriend, the last time she saw him (though they would talk by telephone at least once more). Later, he met with bin al-Shibh who convinced Jarrah to go through with the operation. Jarrah arrived back in the United States on August 5, though other sources indicate that he took his pilot's test on August 2, having missed his sister's wedding to do so. On August 27, he checked into the Pin-Del Motel in Laurel, Maryland, only a mile away from the Valencia Motel, where four other hijackers were staying. On September 7, 2001, all four of the Flight 93 hijackers flew from Fort Lauderdale to Newark International Airport aboard Spirit Airlines.

In the early morning hours of September 9, 2001, Jarrah was pulled over for speeding in Maryland and received a ticket. Jarrah phoned his parents later that day, mentioning that he had received the money order they had sent five days earlier. He told them he intended to see them on September 22 for his cousin's wedding.

On September 10, Jarrah spent his final evening writing a letter to Şengün, with whom he had made marriage plans. This letter is widely interpreted as a suicide note. The letter did not reach Şengün; she had entered witness protection shortly after the attacks and her apartment was unattended. The letter was returned to the United States by the German postal service, where it was discovered and delivered to the FBI. The note contained the phrases "I did what I had to" and "It is a great honour and you will see the result, and everyone will be celebrating."

According to one source, Jarrah had set up a large mock cockpit made of cardboard boxes in his apartment just before the attacks.

September 11 attacks 

Prior to boarding the flight that morning at 5:01 AM, Jarrah in Newark placed a phone call to United Airlines Flight 175 hijacker pilot Marwan al-Shehhi in Boston that lasted 5 minutes (5:01-5:06 AM); this call was believed to state that the plan for the attacks was ready to begin. On September 11, 2001, Jarrah, Saeed al-Ghamdi, Ahmed al-Nami and Ahmed al-Haznawi boarded United Airlines Flight 93 from Newark International Airport at gate A17 without incident, and sat in first-class seats near the cockpit. Before boarding, Ziad Jarrah called his girlfriend Aysel Şengün from a public telephone at the airport, repeating the words "I love you" over and over. Due to a delay, the plane took off at 8:41a.m., five minutes before American Airlines Flight 11 crashed into the World Trade Center. The pilot and crew were notified of the first two hijackings that day, and were told to be on alert. Within minutes, around 9:28a.m., Flight 93 was hijacked as well. The 9/11 Commission stated that Jarrah was the pilot.

The voice of a pilot was heard by air traffic control telling passengers to remain seated. Jarrah announcing, "Ladies and gentlemen: here the captain. Please sit down, keep remaining seating. We have a bomb on board. So sit." At 9:39 a.m., the pilot announced over the radio, "This is the captain. Would like you all to remain seated. There is a bomb on board and are going back to the airport, and to have our demands, so please remain quiet."

At least two of the cellphone calls made by passengers indicate that all the hijackers they saw were wearing red bandannas, and indicated that one of the men, believed to be either Ahmed al-Haznawi or Ahmed al-Nami, had a box tied around his torso, and claimed there was a bomb inside. Passengers on the plane had learned the fates of the other hijacked planes through telephone calls; some decided to act, fearing their plane, too, would be used as a missile. A passenger uprising foiled the terrorists' plans, but failed to save the plane. According to the August 8, 2003, analysis of the plane's cockpit recording by the United States investigators, a group of passengers tried to break into the cockpit. To knock them off balance, Jarrah rolled the plane to the left and right. When this failed, he then pitched the nose forward and back. Jarrah stabilized the plane at 10:00:03. Five seconds later, he asked, "Is that it? Shall we finish it off?" Another hijacker responded, "No. Not yet. When they all come, we finish it off." The voice recorder recorded the sound of the passengers using the food cart as a battering ram against the cockpit door. Jarrah ceased the violent maneuvers at 10:01:00 and recited the takbir (an Islamic prayer) several times. He then asked another hijacker, "Is that it? I mean, shall we put it down?" The other hijacker responded, "Yes, put it in it, and pull it down." The passengers continued their assault and at 10:02:17, a male passenger said, "Turn it up!" A second later, a hijacker said, "Pull it down! Pull it down!" At 10:02:33, Jarrah made a desperate plea in Arabic, screaming "Hey! Hey! Give it to me! Give it to me! Give it to me! Give it to me! Give it to me! Give it to me! Give it to me! Give it to me!", possibly referring to the plane's yoke. The plane crashed just outside of Shanksville, Pennsylvania, at 10:03:11, 125 miles (200 km) from Washington, D.C. All aboard died.

After September 11, Jarrah's girlfriend, Şengün, filed a missing person report in Bochum. Jarrah became a suspect as FBI agents found a "Ziad Jarrahi" in the flight manifest (the additional i at the end a possible misspelling).

Mistaken identity claims 

There have been claims that Jarrah was not a hijacker but rather an innocent passenger or that he was not present on the plane and his identity was stolen. It has been pointed out that his behavior deviated from the profile presented by the other hijackers and that the passengers reported three and not four hijackers. However, the October 2006 emergence of a video shot on January 18, 2000, showing Jarrah recording his will alongside Mohamed Atta has cast heavy doubt on such claims.

Shortly after the September 11 attacks, family and friends claimed that Jarrah did not exhibit the same "smoldering political resentments" or "cultural conservatism" as Mohamed Atta and the other hijackers. Although his family was Sunni Muslim, Jarrah was not raised with a background of religious conviction and did not hold to an obviously conservative lifestyle. Personnel at the flight school Jarrah attended described him as "a normal person". Jarrah called his family two days, and his girlfriend Aysel Şengün three hours, before boarding United Airlines Flight 93; Şengün described the conversation as "pleasant" and "normal". She also claimed that he never mentioned any names of the other hijackers. In his call two days before the attack, Jarrah told his family he would be coming home for a cousin's wedding. "It makes no sense," his uncle Jamal claimed. "He said he had even bought a new suit for the occasion." Jarrah's family in Lebanon claimed in September 2001 that he was an innocent passenger on the plane. His uncle, Jamal Jarrah, is currently a deputy in the Lebanese parliament and was appointed minister on December 18, 2016, and a member of the Future Movement, a pro-Saudi Arabian political party led by Saad Hariri. On January 2, 2012, on a televised interview on Future TV, MPJarrah denied his nephew's involvement in the 9-11 attacks, alluding to a conspiracy.

On October 23, 2001, John Ashcroft claimed that Jarrah had shared a Hamburg apartment with Mohamed Atta and Marwan al-Shehhi, though German authorities that same day told the Los Angeles Times that they had no evidence that any of Jarrah's three apartments in Hamburg had been connected with the other hijackers. One high-ranking German police official stated, "The only information we have connecting the three Hamburg suspects is the FBI's assertion that there is a connection." In October 2006, however, a video surfaced showing Atta and Jarrah together in Afghanistan, clearly connecting Jarrah to the members of the Hamburg cell.

The 9/11 Commission concluded without qualification that Jarrah was a hijacker on the plane when it crashed in Shanksville, Pennsylvania.

In October 2006, an al-Qaeda video was released showing Jarrah and Mohamed Atta recording their wills in January 2000 in Osama Bin Laden's Tarnak Farms base near Kandahar, Afghanistan.

In popular culture 
 Jarrah is the central character in the film The Hamburg Cell (2004), in which he is portrayed by Lebanese actor Karim Saleh. The film focuses on Jarrah's indoctrination to extremism, the formation of the radical Muslims group of the same name, and the preparations for the September 11 attacks.
 Television film The Flight That Fought Back (2005) portrays the passenger uprising inside the hijacked United Airlines 93, with Iranian-American actor Pej Vahdat portraying Jarrah.
 Iranian-American actor Dominic Rains portrayed Jarrah in the television film Flight 93 (2006), which focuses on the hijacking of United Airlines 93.
 Jarrah is portrayed by Egyptian-British actor Khalid Abdalla in the award-winning film United 93 (2006), also featuring the hijacking of United Airlines 93, and the authorities' attempts to save the four hijacked planes during 9/11.
 The 2021 German-French film Copilot (German title: Die Welt Wird Eine Andere Sein, Lit. trans. The World Will Be Different) is based on Jarrah's relationship with Aysel Sengün, prior to the events of September 11, 2001. Portrayed by Lebanese actor Roger Azar, Jarrah is renamed as Saeed Awaad to distance the film from being a docudrama. It was an official Panorama entry at the 71st Berlin International Film Festival, and was theatrically released on the 20th anniversary of the 9/11 attacks.

Notes 
 Unless otherwise sourced, statements in this article come primarily from the 9/11 Commission Report. Where there is substantial disagreement with the report about significant facts in Jarrah's life, this is mentioned explicitly.
 Various sources have speculated that the White House was the target of Flight 93; the 9/11 Commission Report, based on information derived from the interrogations of Khalid Sheikh Mohammed, confidently asserts that it was, in fact, the Capitol Building that was targeted. Additionally, before he was captured, Sheikh Mohammed, along with bin al-Shibh, told an Al Jazeera reporter (who was taken blindfolded to his hideout) back in 2002 that the fourth target was in fact the Capitol Building.
 This account, in the 9/11 Commission Report, is provided solely from the testimony of captured al-Qaeda member Ramzi bin al-Shibh.

See also 
 Hijackers in the September 11 attacks

References

Further reading 

 
 
 
 
 
 
 

1975 births
2001 deaths
Lebanese al-Qaeda members
Participants in the September 11 attacks
University of Greifswald alumni
United Airlines Flight 93
Lebanese Islamists
Lebanese mass murderers
Lebanese Sunni Muslims
People from Beirut
Hamburg cell
Salafi jihadists
Hamburg University of Applied Sciences alumni
Deaths in Somerset County, Pennsylvania